Magic Street (2005) is an urban fantasy novel by American writer Orson Scott Card. This book follows the magical events in the Baldwin Hills section of contemporary Los Angeles, including the life of protagonist Mack Street, his foster brother Cecil Tucker, a trickster identified variously as Bag Man, Puck, Mr. Christmas, and numerous other members of this upscale community of African-Americans.

The storyline frequently refers to Shakespeare's A Midsummer Night's Dream and elements of Western and European folklore.  In the author's note, Card credits friend Roland Bernard Brown with goading him into writing a novel featuring a black hero, and "thanks to Queen Latifah for putting (the Yolanda White character) on a motorcycle."

See also

List of works by Orson Scott Card

External links
 About the novel Magic Street from Card's website

2005 American novels
2005 fantasy novels
Novels by Orson Scott Card
American fantasy novels

Contemporary fantasy novels
Novels set in Los Angeles
Del Rey books